The FCS Kickoff is an annual college football game played on the Saturday before the opening weekend of the college football season. The game showcases teams from the NCAA Division I Football Championship Subdivision (FCS). For the game's first three editions, it was played at campus sites; since 2017, the game has been played at a neutral site, the Cramton Bowl in Montgomery, Alabama. The game is televised nationally by ESPN, and for sponsorship reasons is officially the Guardian Credit Union FCS Kickoff.

History
In February 2013, ESPN announced that the 2014 college football season would begin at its earliest point in 11 years with the creation of the "FCS Kickoff", an annual game which would showcase two top-level teams from the NCAA Division I Football Championship Subdivision.  ESPN stated that during meetings with FCS conference commissioners there was an interest in creating a "tentpole type" event around FCS football and to showcase the quality and depth of FCS football to a national audience.

Under current NCAA rules, FCS teams are not allowed to play their first regular-season game until the Thursday preceding Labor Day. However, an exception to this rule has been carved out for nationally televised events (on either over-the-air or cable networks); teams may participate in such an event against an out-of-conference opponent on the Saturday or Sunday preceding the standard season start date. No more than one team from a conference can participate in such an event in a given season, and no team can appear in such a game in three consecutive seasons.

The 2017 edition marked several changes for the event. First, ESPN took ownership of the event through its ESPN Events division. The event was moved to a neutral site (the Cramton Bowl in Montgomery, Alabama); received a name sponsorship by Guardian Credit Union, a small Montgomery-based credit union; was co-branded as the Montgomery Kickoff Classic; and also took on Alabama FCS member Jacksonville State University as a partner for the 2017 and 2018 editions. As such, JSU participated in both editions of the event. With Jacksonville State barred from a third consecutive FCS Kickoff appearance by NCAA rule, ESPN chose another Alabama program, Samford, as the de facto home team for the 2019 edition.

The 2020 edition, which saw Central Arkansas defeat Austin Peay, was the first since ESPN took ownership of the event that did not feature an Alabama school.

Game results 

Rankings are from the STATS FCS Poll.

Upcoming matchups

Records

By team

By conference

References 

College football kickoff games
NCAA Division I FCS football
Recurring sporting events established in 2014